Vapi (IAST: vāpī,), is a city and municipality in Valsad district in the state of Gujarat, India.It is situated near the banks of the Daman Ganga River, around 28 km south of the district headquarters in the city of Valsad, and it is surrounded by the Union Territory of Dadra and Nagar Haveli and Daman and Diu.  It is believed that the city got its name from the old small stepwell situated near the Balitha area. The meaning of vapi (वापी) in sanskrit is a water reservoir or a water storage body.

The town originally belonged to the Kshatriya Jagirdar family Palande during the Marathi Empire. After independence from the British Crown, the Jagirdar system was abolished by the Indian government in 1951 and the community of Anavil Brahmin who formerly acted as tax farmers during the era of the Maratha Empire received the land.
Vapi is one of the largest industrial areas in Gujarat in terms of small-scale industries, dominated by the chemical industry.

Geography 
NH 48 bisects the city. The western part was the original location of the town, while the eastern part consists mainly of industry and newer residential areas. Mumbai is roughly 180 km to the south, and Surat is about 120  km to the north.

The Arabian Sea, at the delta of the Damanganga, is about 7 km to the west. The city has tropical weather and enjoys three distinct seasons:  winter, summer and monsoon, with rainfall ranging from 100 inches to 120 inches per annum. The Dhobikhadi, Bhilkhadi, Kolak and Damanganga rivers flow through Vapi.

Surrounding locations include Daman, Dadra and Nagar Haveli, Umargam, Sarigam, Bhilad, Udvada, Sanjan and Pardi.

Vapi shares its border with the union territory of Dadra and Nagar Haveli and Daman and Diu and Maharashtra.

The union territory of Dadra and Nagar Haveli and Daman and Diu as well as Sarigam, Bhilad, Umargam, and Pardi, only 12–40 km from Vapi, are good residential and commercial areas. Daman and Silvassa attract tourists from all over the world.

Transport 

National Highway 48 passes through Vapi. It is connected to all major cities. It is the only place from which one can visit Daman and Silvassa. City bus service is available.

To cater to industry, the city hosts what is called a "floating population". The Vapi railway station on the Mumbai-Ahmedabad rail link of Western Railway has become the direct beneficiary in terms of revenues due to daily commuters. It is the only city connecting Daman district with Dadra and Nagar Haveli district.

A coast guard airport is running in Daman where private charters can operate with prior permissions. It will also be one of the stations in the Mumbai–Ahmedabad High Speed Rail Corridor, otherwise known as the 'Bullet train project'.

Economy 

Proximity to the larger cities of Mumbai, Surat, Vadodara, and Ahmedabad, coupled with liberal Government policy, has helped Vapi and surrounding areas attain their current level of industrial activity. The "Vapi Industrial Estate" was started by GIDC in 1967, and has spread to 11.4 square kilometres (4.4 sq mi) and houses over 1,400 industries, the majority of which are small-scale units (SSIs).

Chemical industries such as Aarti, Supreet Chemicals, and textile giants such as Alok industries, Welspun Terry Towels, Century Textiles, GHCL and Raymonds Limited have strong presences in Vapi and nearby areas. Bayer Vapi Pvt Ltd, United Phosphorus Ltd., Supreet Chemicals Pvt Ltd., Sarna Chemicals, Sangir Plastics, Kampun Polymers, Lathia Rubbers, Arti Industries Ltd., Themis Industries and Hubergroup India Pvt Ltd (formerly Micro Inks Limited), operate manufacturing plants in Vapi. Today, about 70% of the total industries in the township are chemical plants, mainly for chemical distillation and the production of pesticides, dyes, dye intermediaries and paints. Other major industries include paper, packaging, pharmaceuticals, plastics, rubber, textiles, wood, computer hardware and software, engineering workshops, glass, and food products. Another striking feature of Vapi is the Common Effluent Treatment Plant (or CETP). This is the largest of its kind in Asia and one of India's biggest effluent treatment plants in terms of capacity, treating the pollutants from these industries before the effluent is released into the river. The CETP is run by Vapi Waste and Effluent Management Company, promoted by the Vapi Industries Association. Vapi has the maximum number of Kraft paper & duplex board paper mills in India. The best quality paper producers are located in Vapi and to have more than 20 kraft paper mills within a distance of 20 km. Therefore, Vapi is also known as "paper hub".

Demography 
As per census of 2011 done by the Indian government, population of Vapi in 2011 was 163,630, of which male and female are 94,105 and 69,525 respectively. The average literacy rate is 89%. Gujarati and Hindi are the most common languages, although due to its need of workers in factories at all levels from labourers to executives, people from all states of India can be found here thriving. 

According to 2011 census, Hinduism is majority religion in Vapi city with 77.37% followers. Islam is second most popular religion with approximately 18.37 % following it. Christianity is followed by 0.62%, Jainism by 3.11%, Sikhism by 0.15% and Buddhism by 0.15%. Around 0.05% stated 'other religion', approximately 0.20% stated 'no particular religion'.

References 

Cities and towns in Valsad district
Vapi